Joseph Thurston Bockrath  is the R. Gordon Kean Professor of Law at the LSU Law Center.  He joined the faculty in 1976 following three years as an assistant professor of marine studies at the College of Marine Studies at the University of Delaware. His teaching areas include civil procedure, constitutional law, professional responsibility, and contracts.

Educational background
A.B., 1968, California State College
J.D., 1971, University of California, Hastings College of the Law

Books
 Contracts and the Legal Environment for Engineers and Architects 6th ed. McGraw-Hill, 2000. ,
This book is part of the curriculum in legal or engineering programs at Drexel University, Western Carolina University, Anna University, Western Kentucky University, and the extension program at University of Pittsburgh.

 Contracts, Specifications & Law for Engineers
 Environmental Law for Engineers, Scientists, and Managers
 Basic Civil Procedure

References

External links
 Profile at law.lsu.edu

American legal scholars
California State University alumni
University of California, Hastings College of the Law alumni
University of Delaware faculty
Louisiana State University faculty
Year of birth missing (living people)
Place of birth missing (living people)
Living people